Intel Extreme Masters Season X – San Jose (IEM San Jose for short) was a video game esports tournament occurring on November 21–22, 2015 in San Jose, California, US. It was the first tournament of 10th season of the Intel Extreme Masters and featured League of Legends and Counter-Strike: Global Offensive tournaments. There was a combined US$175,000 prize pool across both games. In the case of the latter it was the first Counter-Strike event an IEM since IEM Season VI in 2012. Mark Cuban and Brian Krzanich played a charity celebrity exhibition match of League of Legends benefiting The Cybersmile Foundation.

France-based Team EnVyUs decided to withdraw from the Counter-Strike tournament because of flight delays resulting from security concerns following the November 2015 Paris attacks.

The winners of both the European and North American League of Legends Championship Series, Fnatic and Counter Logic Gaming respectively, were invited to the event. There were also a single team from the League of Legends Pro League and League of Legends Champions Korea each, LGD Gaming and Jin Air Green Wings respectively.

The event featured a unique virtual reality fan viewing experience.

League of Legends

Teams 
 Origen (EU LCS)
 Unicorns of Love (EU LCS)
 Counter Logic Gaming (NA LCS)
 Team SoloMid (NA LCS)
 Jin Air Green Wings (LCK)
 LGD Gaming (LPL)

Final standings

Counter-Strike: Global Offensive

Teams
 Counter Logic Gaming
 Cloud9
 G2 Esports
 Luminosity Gaming
 Natus Vincere
 Team Liquid
 Team SoloMid
 Virtus.pro

Final standings

References

External links

 Official webpage
 CS GO Skins website

2015 in esports
Intel Extreme Masters
League of Legends competitions
Sports in San Jose, California
Counter-Strike competitions